Sándor Ádám (1 February 1892 in Budapest – ?) was a Hungarian water polo player who competed in the 1912 Summer Olympics. He was part of the Hungarian team in the 1912 tournament.

References

External links

1892 births
Year of death missing
Hungarian male water polo players
Water polo players at the 1912 Summer Olympics
Olympic water polo players of Hungary
Water polo players from Budapest